Continuous modelling is the mathematical practice of applying a model to continuous data (data which has a potentially infinite number, and divisibility, of attributes). They often use differential equations and are converse to discrete modelling.

Modelling is generally broken down into several steps:

 Making assumptions about the data: The modeller decides what is influencing the data and what can be safely ignored.
 Making equations to fit the assumptions.
 Solving the equations.
 Verifying the results: Various statistical tests are applied to the data and the model and compared.
 If the model passes the verification progress, putting it into practice.
 If the model fails the verification progress, altering it and subjecting it again to verification; if it persists in fitting the data more poorly than a competing model, it is abandoned.

External links
Definition by the UK National Physical Laboratory

Applied mathematics